Pulpe de Vie is a French organic cosmetics brand created in 2009.

Background 
Back in France in 2009 after a sabbatical year in South America, Julie Ducret, together with an investor partner, created Bio Provence within the Marseille Innovation business incubator.

In 2014, a 150,000 euros fundraising exercise was completed with various partners, including Bpifrance and Crédit Agricole.

After 2015, the company made a strategical change: initially listed in parapharmacies and organic stores, it switched to large-scale distribution, increasing production from 5,000 to 10,000 units.

In 2017, a second fundraising exercise of 400,000 euros was announced was announced.   

In 2018, its export policy was suspended in order to refocus on the French market, in particular by developing marketing on social networks, for example, through partnering with influencers.

Production and marketing 
With Ecocert and Cosmébio certified products, Pulpe de Vie targets women aged twenty to thirty-five by focusing on packaging and prices not exceeding twenty euros.   

Inspired by the local purchasing approach, the company works with around twenty regional producers, collecting their "ugly" and unsold fruits as part of an effort to combat food waste,.Purchases are made by a service provider based in Sisteron while the subcontracting laboratory is located in La Fare-les-Oliviers.

References

External links
  

Skin care brands
Cosmetics companies of France
French brands
Personal care brands
Companies based in Provence-Alpes-Côte d'Azur